Domain.com is a domain registrar and web hosting company headquartered in Jacksonville, Florida, and is a subsidiary of Newfold Digital.

History

Domain.com's origins existed as part of the Dotster brand founded by George DeCarlo in 1998. A graduate of the University of Portland, DeCarlo launched Dotster as a project of the Columbia Analytical Services before being purchased by Baker Capital in 2004.

In 2005, Dotster introduced a new domain technology which provided relevant search results based on domains or keywords entered by its users. It was awarded the Domain Pioneer Award from Verisign at the "25 Years of .com Gala" in 2010.

In 2011, Dotster and its subsidiaries, My Domain and Netfirms, were acquired by Endurance International Group. Among the domain names owned by Dotster was www.domain.com, which was determined by leadership to be the strongest branding for their attempt to put more emphasis on the domain registration growth. In 2012, Dotster began migrating domain accreditation to Domain.com, LLC, making it the official registrar for the company's domain business.

Services

Domain.com currently powers more than 1.2 million websites worldwide. Although they are known predominantly as domain registrar, the company also offers resources for shared hosting, WordPress hosting, and SSL certificates. They also are responsible for launching the .xyz top-level domain to increase the number of short, brandable URLs available to the public.

References

Web design companies of the United States
Web hosting
Endurance International Group
Companies based in Vancouver, Washington